Power Book III: Raising Kanan is an American crime drama television series created by Sascha Penn that premiered on July 18, 2021 on Starz. It is a prequel and second spin-off to Power.

In July 2021, the series was renewed for a second season ahead of its premiere. The second season premiered on August 14, 2022. On August 11, the series was renewed for a third season ahead of its second season premiere.

Premise
Set in the 1990s, Raising Kanan chronicles the early years of Kanan Stark (the character first played by executive producer Curtis "50 Cent" Jackson), as he gets into the drug game.

Cast and characters

Main
 Patina Miller as Raquel Thomas, Kanan's mother; one of two major drug lords of Queens
 London Brown as Marvin Thomas, Kanan's uncle. He is Raq and Lou’s older brother
 Malcolm Mays as Louis “Lou-Lou” Thomas, Kanan's uncle. He is Raq and Marvin’s younger brother
 Joey Bada$$ as Unique, Raq's rival drug lord
 Shanley Caswell as Shannon Burke
 Hailey Kilgore as LaVerne "Jukebox" Thomas, Kanan's cousin and Marvin’s daughter
 Toby Sandeman as Symphony Bosket, Raq's boyfriend
 Lovie Simone as Davina Harrison, Kanan's girlfriend (season 1)
 Omar Epps as Malcolm Howard, NYPD Detective and Kanan's biological father 
 Mekai Curtis as Kanan Stark
 Antonio Ortiz as Shawn 'Famous' Figueroa, Kanan's best friend and aspiring rapper (season 2, recurring season 1)
 Grantham Coleman as Ronnie Mathis (season 3)

Recurring
 AnnaLynne McCord as Toni Deep
 Natalee Linez as Jessica Figueroa, Famous' manager and sister and Lou's ex-girlfriend
 Ade Chike Torbert as Scrappy, one of Raq’s most trusted soldiers
 Annabelle Zasowski as Nicole Bingham, Jukebox’s girlfriend (season 1)
 Quincy Brown as Crown Camacho, record label owner/producer of Bulletproof Records
 John Clay III as Worrell, Unique’s right hand man
 Lebrodrick Benson as Cj
 Lawrence Gilliard Jr. as Deen, distributor of the drugs to Unique and Raquel Thomas
 LeToya Luckett as Kenya Pierce, Jukebox’s mother and Marvin’s ex who left the family to make it as a professional singer in Los Angeles. (season 2)
 Omar Dorsey as Cartier "Duns" Fareed (season 2)
 Krystal Joy Brown as Renée Timmons (season 2)
 Danny Mastrogiorgio as Jimmy (season 2)
 Paulina Singer as Zisa, Lou’s new aspiring singer (season 2) 
 Michael Rispoli as Sal Boselli, Mafia Don of NJ (season 2) 
 Paloma Guzman as Detective Regina Foyle
 KJ Smith as Palomar, Corinne's mother & Kanan's ex lover (season 2)
 Josephine Lawrence as Corinne, Palomar's daughter & Kanan's love interest (season 2)
 Chyna Layne as Andrea, Howard's ex lover (season 2)
 Tony Danza as Stefano Marchetti (season 3; guest season 2)

Episodes

Series overview

Season 1 (2021)

Season 2 (2022)

Production
The series was first announced in February 2020. On July 12, 2021, Starz renewed the series for a second season ahead of its premiere. The second season premiered on August 14, 2022. On August 11, 2022, ahead of its second season premiere, Starz renewed the series for a third season.

Reception

Critical response
The review aggregator website Rotten Tomatoes reported a 100% approval rating with an average rating of 9.33/10, based on 6 critic reviews.

Ratings

Season 1

Season 2

References

External links
 
 

2020s American drama television series
2020s American black television series
2020 American television series debuts
American television spin-offs
English-language television shows
Starz original programming
Television series by CBS Studios
Television series by Lionsgate Television
Television series by G-Unit Films and Television Inc.